Mieczysław Sołtys (February 7, 1863 - November 11, 1929) was a Polish composer, conductor, teacher, music and public figure.

Biography 
He studied in Lviv Conservatory as a composer (under Carl Mikuli) and at the same time as philosopher in Lviv University. Then continued to study composition in Vienna and Paris (under Camille Saint-Saens).

In the 1890s he was the conductor of the Lviv choirs of the Echo and Lute societies. From 1891 he was a professor, and from 1899 to 1929 he was director of the Lviv Conservatory. From 1919 he was the chairman of the Polish Union of Musicians in Lviv. He died in Lviv, buried in Lychakiv Cemetery.

Among his students are Stanyslav Lyudkevych and Yosyf Lerer. Mieczysław Sołtys is the author of five operas, including "Maria, Ukrainian Tale" (1909), two symphonies, three symphonic poems, three oratorios, piano concertos, works for organs, choir and solo songs.

His son, was a prominent Polish conductor and composer.

Awards 

 1908 - Order of Franz Joseph I
 1929 - the Commander's Cross of the Order of Polonia Restituta.

References

Further reading 
 The New Grove Dictionary of Music and Musicians, vol. S. Oxford University Press, 2004. .
 Encyklopedia muzyki. Andrzej Chodkowski (red.). Warszawa: PWN, 1995, s. 828. . (in Polish)
 The art of Ukraine: Biographical guide [Мистецтво України : Біографічний довідник]. Kyiv «Українська енциклопедія» ім. М. П. Бажана, 1997. 700 p. . P. 553—554. (in Ukrainian)

External links
 Scores by Mieczysław Sołtys in digital library Polona

Polish composers
1863 births
1929 deaths